Leik Myrabo is an aerospace engineering professor at Rensselaer Polytechnic Institute who retired from there in 2011. He made the first demonstrations of the use of ground-based lasers to propel objects, lifting them hundreds of feet. His goal was to use ground-based lasers to propel objects into orbit; possibly reducing orbit-flight costs by large factors.

Research
Professor Myrabo first had the idea for laser-propelled Lightcraft in the early 1980s, while working on "Star Wars" anti-missile technology. In 1985 he co-wrote, with SF author Dean Ing, a popularization of this and other unconventional propulsion concepts in "The Future of Flight", published by Baen. Myrabo's "lightcraft" design is a reflective funnel-shaped craft that channels heat from the laser, towards the center, causing it to literally explode the air underneath it, generating lift. This method, however is dependent entirely on the laser's power, and even the most powerful models currently can only serve for modest test purposes. To keep the craft stable, a small jet of pressurized nitrogen spins the craft at 6,000 revolutions per minute. Lightcraft were limited to paper studies until about 1996, when Myrabo and Air Force scientist Franklin Mead began trying them out.

The first tests succeeded in reaching over 100 feet, which compares to Robert Goddard's first test flight of his rocket design. In 2000, a new flight record was set with a flight lasting 10.5 seconds and reaching 72 meters (236 feet).

See also
Lightcraft
Spacecraft propulsion

External links
Prof. Leik Myrabo at Rensselaer Polytechnic Institute
CNN Special Report on Myrabo's work
Biography
The Space Show - Dr. Leik Myrabo

References

21st-century American engineers
Rensselaer Polytechnic Institute faculty
Living people
Year of birth missing (living people)